War Heroes is a six-issue limited series from Image Comics, written by Mark Millar,  with art by Tony Harris.

Millar has said "War Heroes is everything I've been leading up to with Civil War, Ultimates, The Authority, Kick-Ass and Wanted" and "This is what my Ultimates 3 would have been if Bryan and I had stuck around."

Publication history
The 6-issue limited series started August 2008 but as of February 2020 only three issues have been published.

Plot
Set in an alternate timeline during the coalition wars in Afghanistan and Iraq, the detonation of a nuclear bomb in Washington D.C. prompts the United States administration to expand the coalition War on Terror to include Iran, as well as institute martial law in the United States. As American casualties increase, morale and public support declines with the economy, reducing America's standing in the world. Lacking the necessary recruits, the US Military boosts enlistment by distributing pills to its soldiers which confer upon them various superpowers, tipping the scale in the war.

The story focus on a group of disenchanted American con artists, who enlist in the military to steal the pills and sell them to foreign investors at $10 million before planning to desert. Initially, however, the con artists had no knowledge of the identity of their clients that they were to sell to until it was revealed to be the terrorist organization, Al-Qaeda. When one of the con artists' brother (a war hero) is taken prisoner in an attack by a super-powered member of Al-Qaeda, the con artists set about rescuing him from a public execution.

Reception
David Wallace reviewed the first issue for Comics Bulletin and concluded that "this is a solid debut that sets up the book's premise quickly and efficiently, and shows a lot of potential for the future." Richard Renteria at Newsarama agrees saying "Millar deftly sets into motion a series of events that are perfectly captured by Harris’ detailed and eye-catching art."

The first issue had sales estimates of 30,637 putting it at 77th in the sales charts.

Film
In September 2008, it was announced that War Heroes had been optioned by Columbia Pictures, with Michael DeLuca as producer and Millar taking an executive producer role. In 2011, Jeff Kirschenbaum bought the film rights from Columbia after they had let it lapse, and he set the film up at Universal Pictures. Thomas Dean Donnelly and Joshua Oppenheimer were considered to write the script.

References

External links

2008 comics debuts
Comics by Mark Millar
Comics set during the Iraq War
Unfinished comics